Andrea Ghezzi (born 3 February 2001) is an Italian footballer who plays as a forward for  club Renate.

Career 
On 16 June 2020 he signed his first contract for Brescia. He did his Serie A debut with Brescia 11 days after in a 2–2 home draw against Genoa. On the same day he extended his contract for Brescia until 2021.
On 3 September 2021, he joined Serie C club Pro Sesto, on loan.

On 14 July 2022, Ghezzi signed a three-year contract with Renate.

Club statistics

Club

References

2001 births
Living people
People from Treviglio
Footballers from Lombardy
Italian footballers
Association football forwards
Serie A players
Serie B players
Serie C players
Brescia Calcio players
S.S.D. Pro Sesto players
A.C. Renate players